Hekim Island (a.k.a. Kilise Island) is an Aegean island of Turkey. It is the second largest of the islands in the gulf (collectively known as Urla Islands) with  area. The nearest point on the main land to the west is  distant. Presently the visits to island are not allowed.

Scholars tentatively identify Hekim Island with the island anciently known as Pele, which was opposite to Clazomenae and was noted by numerous ancient authors including Thucydides, Pliny the Elder, and Stephanus of Byzantium.

Trivia
The name of the island hekim means "doctor". According to a legend a doctor who was on his way to Greece according to the Population exchange between Greece and Turkey agreement chose to stay in İzmir and settled in the island to create his own farm.

References

Islands of İzmir Province
Urla District
Islands of Turkey
Aegean islands
Gulf of İzmir
Important Bird Areas of Turkey